James Thompson (24 January 1899 – 1961) was an English footballer who played for Bathgate, Oldham Athletic, Manchester City, Stalybridge Celtic, Ashton National Gas, Port Vale, Accrington Stanley, Swindon Town, Crewe Alexandra, and Hurst.

Career
Thompson played for Bathgate, Oldham Athletic, Manchester City, Stalybridge Celtic and Ashton National Gas, before joining Port Vale in January 1923. He scored his first goal for the club on 3 February, in a 2–0 win over Blackpool at The Old Recreation Ground. He also claimed goals against Derby County and Southampton to take his tally for the club to three goals in eight Second Division games. Despite this, he was released at the end of the season. He moved on to Blackpool in 1923, and made his debut for Major Frank Buckley's team on 8 September, in a 2–2 draw with Stoke City at the Victoria Ground. He appeared in the five league games that followed, scoring one goal — in a 2–2 draw at Sheffield Wednesday on 6 October. Shortly afterwards, he joined Accrington Stanley, before going on to play for Swindon Town, Crewe Alexandra, Hurst and Wilson's Brewery.

Career statistics
Source:

References
Specific

General
 

People from Chadderton
English footballers
Footballers from Oldham
Association football inside forwards
Bathgate F.C. players
Oldham Athletic A.F.C. players
Manchester City F.C. players
Stalybridge Celtic F.C. players
Ashton National F.C. players
Port Vale F.C. players
Blackpool F.C. players
Accrington Stanley F.C. (1891) players
Swindon Town F.C. players
Crewe Alexandra F.C. players
Ashton United F.C. players
English Football League players
1899 births
1961 deaths